Langflog Glacier is a glacier flowing north between Mount Hochlin and Langfloget Cliff in the Mühlig-Hofmann Mountains of Queen Maud Land, Antarctica. It was mapped by Norwegian cartographers from surveys and air photos by the Sixth Norwegian Antarctic Expedition (1956–60) and named Langflogbreen (long rock wall glacier).

See also
 List of glaciers in the Antarctic
 Glaciology

References

 

Glaciers of Queen Maud Land
Princess Martha Coast